Intimacy was published in 1998 by playwright and novelist Hanif Kureishi. The novel deals with a middle-aged man and his thoughts about leaving his wife and two young sons.

Plot summary
Set in contemporary London, the story tells why the protagonist wants to leave his family. The timespan of the novel is roughly 24 hours.

He has lived with his partner for six years and has known her for ten. He is unhappy in his relationship and has had several affairs.
His young lover one day says to him, "If you want me, I'm here". He spends 24 hours reflecting on his relationships with his wife, sons, friends and lover.

In the end he leaves the family.

Style
The writing style is similar to Imre Kertész's Kaddis a meg nem született gyermekért (Kaddish for a Child Not Born) -inner dialogue mixed with flashbacks, explaining and contemplating the thoughts of the protagonist.

Major themes
Some of the themes of the book are:
 Old family constructs in a modern society.
 Sexual desires versus intellectual desires.

Film adaptation
Intimacy was adapted into a 2001 film of the same name directed by Patrice Chéreau, starring Mark Rylance and Kerry Fox.

Novels by Hanif Kureishi
Novels set in London
1998 British novels
Faber and Faber books
British novels adapted into films
Novels set in one day